José Miguel Gil (born 28 February 1971) is a Spanish diver. He competed at the 1988, 1992, 1996 and the 2000 Summer Olympics.

References

1971 births
Living people
Spanish male divers
Olympic divers of Spain
Divers at the 1988 Summer Olympics
Divers at the 1992 Summer Olympics
Divers at the 1996 Summer Olympics
Divers at the 2000 Summer Olympics
Divers from Madrid